Wang Burapha is a historic neighbourhood in Bangkok, regarded as the first commercial and entertainment district in contemporary Thailand (after 1932 revolution). It is situated between Charoen Krung, Maha Chai, Phahurat, Tri Phet and Burapha roads, near the eastern edge of the old city centre of Rattanakosin Island in Wang Burapha Phirom Subdistrict, Phra Nakhon District. The neighbourhood is named after Buraphaphirom Palace, which used to be located here until the 1950s, when it was demolished to make way for commercial developments. The neighbourhood became a major commercial district and a centre of youth culture during the 1950s–60s.

During its prosperous era, it was a venue for teenagers similar to Siam Square at present. This group of teenagers has been called "Koh Lang Wang" (โก๋หลังวัง), translate as "mobster behind the palace". They have a unique dress style with Western fashion in those days, favor listening to Elvis Presley or Cliff Richard's music, and most favorite star was James Dean. Because Thailand at that time was influenced by American culture through enlisted soldiers (G.I.) who set up the base to fight in the Vietnam War. Their stories have been referred into at least three Thai movies, including Dang Bireley's and Young Gangsters in 1997,  Born Blood in 2002, and The Gangster in 2012.

Wang Burapha in its prosperous era was a home to three movie theaters, namely Kings, Queens, and Grand, also the Sala Chalermkrung Royal Theatre was located adjacent to each other separately. There are also markets and shops of foreigners located nearby such as  Ming Mueang Market, Bampen Bun Market, Bombai, Rattana Mala, Wiang Fah, Lilly, Yong Tiang Store etc. and also filled with many cafés and restaurants including photo studios.  In terms of travel it was also regarded as a bus terminal and has a tram running through as well.

Wang Burapa began to gradually decline in popularity in 1965 when Siam Square and Ratchaprasong Shopping Centre were replaced. Ming Mueang Market was dismantled in 1978 and the last movie theater, Queens, was dissolved in 1990.  Today, the location of Ming Mueang Market has become The Old Siam Plaza.

At present, around Wang Burapha is regarded as the centre of the gun shop, there are many famous shops located here, also being the centre of many leading bookstores as well. In the area of some restaurants that have been operating since the heyday era, they are still operating as in the past even though the general condition of this neighbourhood is very sluggish.

References 

Neighbourhoods of Bangkok
Phra Nakhon district